Deborah L. Graham (born May 2, 1966) was a member of the Chicago City Council.  From March 2010 until February 24, 2015, she has represented the 29th Ward on Chicago's West Side. She was appointed by Mayor Richard M. Daley. Prior to her service as a city councilwoman, Graham was a Democratic member of the Illinois House of Representatives, representing the 78th District from 1995 until 2010. She was the secretary for the Illinois Legislative Black Caucus.

Committee appointments 
She was appointed to serve on the Committee of the Whole; Housing & Urban Development; Appropriations-General Service (Vice-Chairperson); Appropriations-Human Services; Labor; Transportation & Motor Vehicles; and the Licenses and Registration, Subcommittee (Sub-Co-Chairperson).

References

External links
Illinois General Assembly - Representative Deborah L. Graham (D) 78th District official IL House website
Bills Committees
Project Vote Smart - Representative Deborah L. Graham (IL) profile
Follow the Money - Deborah L. Graham
2006 2004 2002 campaign contributions
Illinois House Democrats - Deborah L. Graham profile
Ballotpedia - Deborah L. Graham

Living people
1966 births
Chicago City Council members
Illinois Democrats
Women city councillors in Illinois
African-American women in politics
African-American state legislators in Illinois
Women state legislators in Illinois
Robert Morris University Illinois alumni
21st-century American politicians
21st-century American women politicians
Chicago City Council members appointed by Richard M. Daley
African-American city council members in Illinois